The following lists events that happened during 1965 in the Grand Duchy of Luxembourg.

Incumbents

Events

January – March
 26 February - Fernand Georges is appointed to the Council of State.
 2 March – Luxembourg City is agreed to remain one of the seats of the European Union as part of the negotiations over the Merger Treaty.
 20 March – Representing Luxembourg, France Gall wins the Eurovision Song Contest 1965 with the song Poupée de cire, poupée de son.

April – June
 12 June – A law is signed governing industrial relations, making arbitration compulsory.

July – September
 23 August – Antoine Krier replaces Nicolas Biever in the government, after Biever's death the previous month.

October – December
 30 December – Compulsory national service is reduced to six months.

Births
 14 January – Désirée Nosbusch, singer and presenter of Eurovision Song Contest 1984, the last time Luxembourg hosted the Eurovision Song Contest. 
 22 October – Georges Lentz, composer
 4 December - Françoise Groben, cellist
 10 December – Alain Hamer, football referee

Deaths
 15 July – Nicolas Biever, politician and trade unionist

Footnotes

References